List of Registered Historic Places in Elko County, Nevada, USA:

The locations of National Register properties and districts (at least for all showing latitude and longitude coordinates below), may be seen in an online map by clicking on "Map of all coordinates".

The county has 5 listings on the National Register, and one former listing.

Current listings 

|}

Former listings

|}

See also

 List of National Historic Landmarks in Nevada
 National Register of Historic Places listings in Nevada

References

 
Elko